Tadeusz Fijewski (14 July 1911 – 12 November 1978) was a Polish stage and film actor. He appeared in 50 films between 1927 and 1978.

Selected filmography

 Zew morza (1927)
 Przedwiosnie (1928)
 Pod banderą miłości (1929)
 Prokurator Alicja Horn (1933)
 Młody Las (1934)
 Córka generała Pankratowa (1934)
 Granny Had No Worries (1935)
 Znachor (1937)
 Pawel i Gawel (1938)
 Border Street (1948)
 Nikodem Dyzma (1956)
 Kapelusz pana Anatola (1957)
 Pan Anatol szuka miliona (1958)
 Pętla  aka The Noose (1958)
 Inspekcja pana Anatola (1959)
 The Impossible Goodbye (1962)
 Black Wings (1963)
 The First Day of Freedom (1964)
 Three Steps on Earth (1965)
 Lenin in Poland (1966)
 The Doll  (1968)
 Czterej pancerni i pies (1966-1970)
 Kamizelka (1971)
 Na przelaj (1972)
 Chlopi (1972)
 Peasants (1973)
 Wiosna, panie sierzancie (1974)
 Nights and Days (Noce i dnie) (1975)
 Kazimierz Wielki (1976)
 Pelnia (1979)

References

External links
 
 Tadeusz Fijewski at the Culture.pl 

1911 births
1978 deaths
Polish male film actors
Polish male silent film actors
Male actors from Warsaw
20th-century Polish male actors
Polish male child actors
Polish male stage actors
Officers of the Order of Polonia Restituta
Recipients of the Gold Cross of Merit (Poland)
Dachau concentration camp survivors
Warsaw Uprising insurgents
Burials at Powązki Cemetery